Yhonathan Alexander Yustiz Linarez (born 27 January 1992) is a Venezuelan footballer who plays as a goalkeeper for Portuguesa in the Venezuelan Primera División.

Career

Aragua
Yustiz joined Aragua F.C. in 2017, making his league debut during the club's opening match of the season, a 3–1 defeat to Zamora. He became the club's starting goalkeeper during his first season, quickly racking up 50 appearances through just a year and a half of competition. By the midpoint of the following season, Yustiz had registered seven clean sheets through 13 matches, as Aragua finished fifth in the Apertura tournament. In 2021, Yustiz celebrated his fifth year with the club, and also made his 120th appearance for Aragua.

Portuguesa
Ahead of the 2022 season, Yustiz moved to Portuguesa. Following the midpoint of the 2022 Venezuelan Primera División season, media outlet Idioma Futve named Yustiz amongst their team of the season. At the conclusion of the season, Yustiz had kept the most clean sheets, tallying 15 through 36 matches.

References

External links

1992 births
Living people
Caracas FC players
Aragua FC players
Portuguesa F.C. players
Venezuelan Primera División players
Venezuelan footballers
Association football goalkeepers
People from Maracay